Private Warren C. Dockum (January 1, 1844 – October 2, 1921) was an American soldier who fought in the American Civil War. Dockum received the country's highest award for bravery during combat, the Medal of Honor, for his action during the Battle of Sayler's Creek in Virginia on 6 April 1865. He was honored with the award on 10 May 1865.

Biography
Dockum was born in Clintonville, New York on 1 January 1844. He enlisted into the 121st New York Infantry. He died on 2 October 1921 and his remains are interred at the Roselawn Cemetery in Pueblo, Colorado.

Medal of Honor citation

See also

List of American Civil War Medal of Honor recipients: A–F

References

1844 births
1921 deaths
People of New York (state) in the American Civil War
Union Army officers
United States Army Medal of Honor recipients
American Civil War recipients of the Medal of Honor